Lotus Air was an airline based in Cairo, Egypt. It was a privately owned charter airline flying mainly to Europe. Its main base was Cairo International Airport, with hubs at Sharm el-Sheikh International Airport, Hurghada International Airport and Luxor International Airport.

History
Lotus Air was one of the first private airlines in the Middle East and North Africa region. It was established in 1997 by Al-Fawares Holding Company and commenced operations in 1998.

The main business centred on charter operations, ad-hoc flights, ACMI (Aircraft, Crew, Maintenance, and Insurance) operations, damp leases, technical services, ground handling and crew training.

The airline was the first in Egypt to receive EASA standards maintenance certification and IOSA certification (IATA Operational Safety Audit).

Fleet
The Lotus Air fleet consisted of the following aircraft (at June 2010):

References

External links

Defunct airlines of Egypt
Airlines established in 1997
Airlines disestablished in 2011
2011 disestablishments in Egypt
Companies based in Cairo
Egyptian companies established in 1997